Ferdinand 'Ferdi' Rudols Marcel Vierklau (born 1 April 1973) is a Dutch retired footballer who played as a right back.

Club career
Vierklau was born in Bilthoven, Utrecht. In his country, he played for FC Utrecht, Vitesse Arnhem and AFC Ajax (March 1999 to June 2002), appearing in 185 Eredivisie matches over 11 seasons and scoring five goals; he won the double with the Amsterdam club in the 2001–02 campaign, but was already a fringe player at the time.

Vierklau also played one and a half seasons with CD Tenerife in Spain, being relegated in his second year in La Liga and subsequently signing with Ajax. He retired at the age of 29.

International career
Vierklau earned two caps for the Netherlands, in a period of eight months. His debut was on 5 October 1996, as he played 71 minutes in a 3–1 away win against Wales for the 1998 FIFA World Cup qualification stages.

Honours
Ajax
Eredivisie: 2001–02
KNVB Cup: 1998–99, 2001–02

References

External links
Beijen profile 
Stats at Voetbal International 

1973 births
Living people
People from De Bilt
Dutch sportspeople of Surinamese descent
Dutch footballers
Association football defenders
Eredivisie players
FC Utrecht players
SBV Vitesse players
AFC Ajax players
La Liga players
CD Tenerife players
Netherlands international footballers
Dutch expatriate footballers
Expatriate footballers in Spain
Dutch expatriate sportspeople in Spain
USV Elinkwijk players
Footballers from Utrecht (province)